Holospira elizabethae is a species of air-breathing land snail, a terrestrial pulmonate gastropod mollusc in the family Urocoptidae.

Paratypes of this species are in the collection of the Natuurhistorisch Museum Rotterdam.

Original description 
Holospira elizabethae was originally discovered and described by Henry Augustus Pilsbry in 1889. The type locality is Amula village, which is between the towns of Tixtla and Chilapa de Álvarez, in the State of Guerrero, Mexico.

Shell description 
Comparison of apertural view of adult and juvenile shells of Holospira elizabethae:

Comparison of basal (umbilical) views of adult and juvenile shells of Holospira elizabethae:

Distribution 
This species occurs in Mexico.

References

External links 

 Photo of the shell of Holospira elizabethae
 in Manual of Conchology 15
 page 99-100
 plate 15, figure 6-15
 plate 26, figure 27 (figure 27 does not seem like Holospira elizabethae although this figure is mentioned as this twice in the book)

Urocoptidae
Gastropods described in 1889